Semih Kaya (born 24 February 1991) is a former Turkish professional footballer who played as a centre back, most recently for Galatasaray. On August 12, 2022, he announced on his social media accounts that he was leaving football.

Club career

Early career
Kaya joined Galatasaray's youth academy from Altay's youth team when he was 15.

On 25 February 2007, when he was playing against older young players in the season of Süper Gençler Ligi (Super Youth League) against Beşiktaş, in the fifth minute of the game, a kick from Batuhan Karadeniz collided with his head, forcing him to leave the game; he later went to a hospital to undergo head surgery (coagulation).

The start of the 2008–09 season saw foreign interest in Kaya rise, with reports that Italian club Internazionale were monitoring him ahead of a transfer deal, though the rumours never materialized.

Kaya's first Süper Lig appearance was against İstanbul B.B. on 19 February 2009. After not receiving significant playing time, he joined fellow Süper Lig club Gaziantepspor on loan in January 2010 for the remainder of the season, and, in the summer of 2010 he signed for Turkish First League side Kartalspor on loan. On 18 October 2010, he scored two goals in the A2 Lig game against Altay.

Return to Galatasaray
At the beginning of the 2011–12 season, Kaya was not typically selected for Galatasaray's starting line-up, but following injuries to other players, notably Gökhan Zan, and a fall in form of Servet Çetin, Galatasaray coach Fatih Terim granted him a chance to prove himself. Following a series of solid performances, he soon became first-choice centreback alongside the Czech Tomáš Ujfaluši.

Kaya scored his first goal for the club against Samsunspor on 7 January 2012 in the 51st minute of a 2–0 comeback, with the game ending 4–2 for Galatasaray. In the 2011–12 season, he played 30 games and was a key member of the championship-winning squad. He continued to be first choice centre-back for the club and country, delivering calm and confident performances despite against top teams such as Manchester United and, internationally, against the Netherlands. He finished his second year with 36 appearances in all competitions. On 18 November 2013, his contract was extended for three years until 2016.

Galatasaray – third spell
On 3 February 2022, Kaya joined Galatasaray for the third time in his career.

International career
Kaya has played for all levels of the Turkish national team, including the under-21 level despite being at a younger age at the time. He made his debut for senior Turkish side on 29 February 2012, playing the entire game against Slovakia in a 2–1 loss. He is part of the Turkish national team for Euro 2016.

Personal life
Kaya's grandfather was Torbesh and he emigrated from Macedonia to the Turkish city of İzmir. He is the youngest of three brothers.

Career statistics

Club

International

Honours
Galatasaray
Süper Lig (4): 2011–12, 2012–13, 2014–15, 2018–19
 Türkiye Kupası (4): 2013–14, 2014–15, 2015–16,  2018–19
Süper Kupa (5): 2008, 2012, 2013, 2015, 2016
AC Sparta Prag

 Czech Cup(1) : 2019–20

Individual
Süper Lig: Young Player of the Year (1): 2011–12

References

External links

 
 
 
 
 
 

1991 births
Living people
People from Bergama
Turkish footballers
Turkey international footballers
Turkish people of Macedonian descent
Turkey under-21 international footballers
Turkey youth international footballers
Galatasaray A2 footballers
Galatasaray S.K. footballers
Gaziantepspor footballers
Kartalspor footballers
Süper Lig players
Association football central defenders
UEFA Euro 2016 players
AC Sparta Prague players
Expatriate footballers in the Czech Republic
Turkish expatriate footballers
Turkish expatriate sportspeople in the Czech Republic
Czech First League players
Yeni Malatyaspor footballers